Glyphidocera lophandra is a moth in the family Autostichidae. It was described by Edward Meyrick in 1929. It is found in Brazil and Peru.

The wingspan is 10–11 mm. The forewings are pale ochreous irregularly irrorated (sprinkled) with fuscous and dark fuscous, posteriorly tending to form suffused streaks between the veins. There is a small elongate dark fuscous spot in the disc at one-fifth. The stigmata form small elongate dark fuscous spots, the plical obliquely before the first discal, sometimes a smaller similar spot on the fold beneath the middle of the wing. There is a marginal series of small dark fuscous spots around the apical part of the costa and termen. The hindwings are whitish grey, more whitish anteriorly.

References

Moths described in 1929
Glyphidocerinae